The first Baltic Chess Congress took place in Riga, Latvia (then Russian Empire), in 1899. The winner was Robert Behting, the elder brother of Kārlis Bētiņš, who won a play-off game with Karl Wilhelm Rosenkrantz. The second Baltic Chess Congress was played in Dorpat, Estonia (then Russian Empire), in 1901. There were four winners.

The first Baltic Chess Championship was held in the city of Klaipėda, Lithuania, on May 22–27, 1931. The eight-player single round-robin tournament was won by Isakas Vistaneckis (LTU) 4.5/7, a half point ahead of S. Gordonas (LTU), Paul Saladin Leonhardt (GER), Vladas Mikėnas (EST/LTU) and Vladimirs Petrovs (LAT). The three others, Fricis Apšenieks (LAT), Aleksandras Machtas (LTU), and E. Gertschikoff (GER) finished in consecutive places.

Winners

{| class="sortable wikitable"
! # !! Year !! City !! Winner
|-
| 1* || 1899 || Riga || , 
|-
|-
| 3* || 1904 || Reval || , 
|-
| 4* || 1907 || Riga || 
|-
| 5* || 1911 || Libau || 
|-
| 6* || 1913 || Mitau || 
|-
| 1 || 1931 || Klaipėda || 
|-
| ? || ? || ? || 
|-
|  || 1944/45 || Riga || 
|-
|  || 1945 || Riga || 
|-
|  || 1946 || Vilnius || 
|-
|  || 1947 || Pärnu || 
|-
|  || 1950 || Pärnu || 
|-
|  || 1952 || Pärnu || 
|-
|  || 1955 || Pärnu || 
|-
|  || 1958 || Pärnu ||  & 
|-
|  || 1960 || Pärnu || 
|-
|  || 1961 || Palanga || 
|-
|  || 1963 || Estonia || 
|-
|  || 1964 || Pärnu || 
|-
|  || 1965 || Palanga || 
|-
|  || 1966 || Naroch ||  
|-
|   || 1967 || Jūrmala || 
|-
|   || 1968 || Pärnu ||   
|-
|   || 1969 || Riga ||  
|-
|   || 1970 || Pärnu ||  
|-
|   || 1971 || Pärnu ||  
|-
|   || 1973 || Homel ||   
|-
|   || 1974 || Pärnu ||  
|-
|   || 1975 || Riga ||   
|-
|   || 1976 || Klaipėda || 
|-
|   || 1977 || Homel ||   
|-
|   || 1978 || Haapsalu ||   
|-
|   || 1979 || Daugavpils || 
|-
|   || 1981 || Homel ||  
|-
|   || 1982 || Pärnu ||  
|-
|   || 1985 || Pärnu ||  
|-
|   || 1986 || Haapsalu || ,  & 
|-
|   || 1987 || Kuldīga || ,  & 
|-
|   || 1988 || Panevėžys ||  
|}

References

RUSBASE (part V) 1919-1937,1991-1994
RUSBASE (part IV) 1938-1960
RUSBASE (part III), 1961-1969,1985-1990
RUSBASE (part II) 1970-1984

Supranational chess championships
Chess in Estonia
Chess in Latvia
Chess in Lithuania
1899 in chess
1931 in chess
1945 in chess
Recurring events established in 1899
Recurring events disestablished in 1988
Chess in Europe